The Los Angeles County Board of Supervisors (LACBOS) is the five-member governing body of Los Angeles County, California, United States.

History

On April 1, 1850 the citizens of Los Angeles elected a three-man Court of Sessions as their first governing body. A total of 377 votes were cast in this election. In 1852, the Legislature dissolved the Court of Sessions and created a five-member Board of Supervisors. In 1913 the citizens of Los Angeles County approved a charter recommended by a board of freeholders which gave the County greater freedom to govern itself within the framework of state law.

As the population expanded throughout the twentieth century, Los Angeles County did not subdivide into separate counties or increase the number of supervisors as its population soared. Today, each supervisor represents more than two million people. As a consequence, individual Supervisors often had a substantial influence over the governance of the county, and the group was collectively known as the "five little kings".

With the election of Holly Mitchell to the board in 2020, the board of supervisors were occupied entirely by women for the first time in its history.

Governance

Elections
Supervisors are elected to four-year terms by a vote of Los Angeles County citizens who reside in the supervisorial district. Supervisors must reside and be voters in the district they represent. Elections for the 1st and 3rd districts coincide with California's gubernatorial elections, while those for the 2nd, 4th and 5th districts coincide with the United States presidential election. Supervisorial terms begin the first Monday in December after the election.

Term limits
In March 2002, Los Angeles County voters passed Measure B to limit the supervisors to three consecutive four-year terms. If a supervisor fills a vacancy, the unexpired term counts towards the term limit if there are more than two years (half the term) left to serve. The provisions of the measure were not retroactive, meaning that the term limit clock for supervisors who were serving at the time the measure passed would start with the next election. At the time term limits were imposed, Don Knabe, Mike Antonovich, and Yvonne Brathwaite Burke’s terms were scheduled to end in 2016 (Brathwaite Burke chose to retire in 2008), while Gloria Molina and Zev Yaroslavsky served their terms until 2014.

Board of Supervisors Chair/Mayor

The chair or “mayor” of the Board of Supervisors serves a term of one year, meaning that a supervisor who is elected for a term on the board will get a chance to serve at least one term as chair/mayor. Upon expiration of the term, the duties of the chair/mayor are rotated among the board members by order of seniority. Along with their general responsibilities as a member of the board of supervisors, the chair/mayor has several unique duties to fulfill, including presiding over board meetings and controlling the agenda of the board. During his or her term of office, the chair has the option of calling himself or herself “mayor”, a practice that was started by Michael D. Antonovich during his tenure as a supervisor. This tradition was not continued by the current incumbents.

CEO

Until recently, the chief executive officer was the appointed individual heading the county but had little power as supervisors retained the right to fire and hire department heads and often directly admonished department heads in public.

Based on an ordinance authored by Supervisors Knabe and Yaroslavsky that took effect in April 2007, the CEO directly oversees departments on behalf of the supervisors, although the Los Angeles County Fire Department, Los Angeles County Sheriff's Department, Assessor, District Attorney, Auditor-Controller, and Executive Office of the Board of Supervisors continue to be under the direct purview of the Board of Supervisors. The change was made in response to several candidates either dropping out or declining to accept the position to replace former Chief Administrative Officer David Janssen. Antonovich was the lone supervisor to oppose the change, stating that such a move would lead to a more autocratic form of government and disenfranchise the 1.3 million who live in unincorporated areas.

However, this was rescinded in 2015 and the CEO has returned to a facilitation and coordination role between departments. Departments continue to submit recommendations and agenda items to the Board to be adopted and ratified, and the Board directly manages relations with the department heads instead of going through the CEO, as would be the case in a council-manager system prevalent in most of the county's cities. In 2016, the CEO further recommended, and the Board approved, transferring positions considered "transactional" and focusing the CEO on "strategic" initiatives and long-term, structural issues.

Board meetings

The Board meets every Tuesday at 9:30 a.m. at the Board Hearing Room (381B) at the Kenneth Hahn Hall of Administration in Downtown Los Angeles. On Tuesdays following a Monday holiday, Board meetings begin after lunch, at 1:00 p.m. Board meetings are conducted in accordance with Robert's Rules of Order, the Brown Act (California’s sunshine law), and the Rules of the Board. The Chief Executive Officer, the County Counsel and the Executive Officer, or their deputies, attend each Board meeting.
 
The regular agendas for the first, second, third and fifth Tuesdays of the month are essentially a consent calendar, that is, all items are automatically approved without discussion, unless a Supervisor or member of the public requests discussion of a specific item. The fourth Tuesday of the month is reserved for the purpose of conducting legally required public hearings, Board of Supervisors motions and department items continued from a previous meeting, have time constraints, or are critical in nature. Since Board meetings are considered Brown Act bodies, a Board agenda is published 72 hours before the Board meeting is convened.
 
At the start of a meeting, after an invocation and the Pledge of Allegiance, all items that do not have "holds" placed on them by a Supervisor or a member of the public, or are mandatory public hearings, are approved on a consent calendar. Following that, presentations of various dignitaries (e.g., local consulate officials, awards to County employees and the general public, and pets for adoption) are made. Then, items that were not approved are called in numerical order unless a supervisor wishes to take items out of order.
 
Members of the public are allotted three minutes to make public comment on all the agenda items that they intend to discuss. An additional three minutes are provided during general public comment on any topic within the board's jurisdiction. Individuals must submit comment cards before the start of the meeting and wait until their item is called. On popular topics with multiple speakers, comments may be restricted to as little as one minute each, and the board has the discretion to figuratively muzzle anyone who is addressing the board in a disruptive manner.
 
Weekly Board meetings are broadcast live online and televised on local public television (KLCS Channel 58). Transcripts and statements of proceedings are published online. However, because some Board decisions have major implications, speakers and protesters on behalf of many causes regularly attend the meetings. The county is sued frequently by various public interest law firms and organizations on behalf of people who disagree with the Board's decisions.

Criticism and controversy

Board expansion
"Good-government" advocates have long supported the idea of expanding Board membership to reduce the size of each district, and establishing an elected County Executive as a check and balance on the Board's power, but voters have rejected such proposals every time they have appeared on the ballot. However, former supervisor Gloria Molina supported expansion of the Board (to potentially increase Hispanic representation), and former supervisor Zev Yaroslavsky supported both Board expansion and the creation of an elected County Executive, much like in King County, Washington.

Cooperation with ICE agents in jails
From 2005 to 2015, the board had a program, known as 287(g), that allowed federal U.S. Immigration and Customs Enforcement agents into county jails to determine whether inmates were in the country legally. After 2015, the board of supervisors and the Los Angeles County Sheriff's Department still cooperate with federal immigration agents.

Interim public defender appointment
In 2018, the board appointed Nicole Tinkham as interim public defender, despite a letter signed by 390 public defenders who were concerned that Tinkham lacked criminal law experience and the potential for a conflict of interest, given Tinkham’s prior representation of the Los Angeles County Sheriff’s Department. Prior to the appointment, the board had failed to appoint a permanent Public Defender, following the retirement of Ronald Brown. One deputy public defender testified to the board: “I feel like you are making a mockery of my life’s work … clearly somebody failed to think this through.” The American Civil Liberties Union has also criticized the appointment of Tinkham.

Naming of public space
During a supervisor’s term in office, public spaces in Los Angeles County are often named after them. In 2018, the Los Angeles Times criticized the board for their decision to name a new mental health center after Supervisor Sheila Kuehl while she remained in office. Kuehl was in her first term as a Supervisor and had just assumed the board chairmanship. The Times also criticized other past supervisors for the same practice, such as Mike Antonovich.

Racial and political gerrymandering
In 1991, a federal court ruled that the board denied Latinos a chance to be elected to the board. The court found that supervisors, all white, purposefully gerrymandered districts so that Latinos were a minority in each of them, a Voting Rights Act violation. As a result, Gloria Molina, the first Latina supervisor, was elected to the board of supervisors.

In 2010, Los Angeles created a nonpartisan commission to impartially redraw the districts for the board of supervisors.”

In 2016, Governor Brown, however, signed Senate Bill 958 which states that “the political party preferences of the commission members…shall be as proportional as possible to the total number of voters who are registered with each political party in the County of Los Angeles.” Some argue that the new bill infringes upon the rights of political minority parties and independent voters.

Transparency
In 2018, the Los Angeles Times editorial board criticized the board for a lack of transparency and accountability. In early 2015, the board was to discuss and adopt a set of policy priorities and post them on the county's website, together with an explanation of how they would be implemented and a schedule of hearings so the public could weigh in. The Times criticized the board for not following through on that promise.

Current Supervisors

Members of the Board are officially nonpartisan, and are elected by constituents of their respective districts. As of 2022, they are:

Current County Chair & Chair Pro Tem 
Current County Chair is Janice Hahn & Current County Chair Pro Tem is Lindsey Horvath As of 2022.

Supervisorial districts
Los Angeles County is divided into 5 supervisorial districts (SDs), with each Supervisor representing a district of approximately 2 million people.

References

External links

Los Angeles County Board of Supervisors
Los Angeles County Supervisors - Past To Present

 
B
County government in California
Politicians from Greater Los Angeles
County governing bodies in the United States